The Henry Hudson Bridge is a steel arch toll bridge in New York City across the Spuyten Duyvil Creek. It connects Spuyten Duyvil in the Bronx with Inwood in Manhattan to the south, via the Henry Hudson Parkway (NY 9A). On the Manhattan side, the parkway goes into Inwood Hill Park. Commercial vehicles are not permitted on this bridge or on the parkway in general.

The bridge is operated by MTA Bridges and Tunnels, an affiliate agency of the Metropolitan Transportation Authority.

Design

The bridge was designed by David B. Steinman, drawing upon his 1911 Ph.D. thesis in civil engineering at Columbia University. Named to commemorate the voyage of Henry Hudson on the Half Moon, which anchored near the site in 1609, it was the longest plate girder arch and fixed arch bridge in the world when it opened in 1936.

The bridge has two roadway levels carrying a total of seven traffic lanes and a pedestrian walkway and spans Spuyten Duyvil Creek just east of where the tidal strait meets the Hudson River.  The bridge is part of the Henry Hudson Parkway, New York State Route 9A. To its west, at five feet above water level, is the Spuyten Duyvil Bridge, which is used by Amtrak trains to Albany, New York and other points north. The Spuyten Duyvil Metro-North station is under the Henry Hudson Bridge on the Bronx side.

History

A bridge at this location was proposed as early as 1906, but Spuyten Duyvil residents and other civic groups opposed the bridge, arguing that it would destroy the virgin forest of Inwood Hill Park and bring traffic congestion to Bronx communities. Robert Moses preferred the route along the Hudson River because he was able to receive the land to build the Henry Hudson Parkway at no cost and use federal labor to build the parkway. The construction of the bridge helped open the Riverdale neighborhood to development.

The original single-deck structure was built for the Henry Hudson Parkway Authority by the American Bridge Company at a cost of $4.949 million and opened on December 12, 1936. The upper level of the bridge was designed to be added at a later date and opened to traffic on May 7, 1938. The second deck was added at an additional cost of about $2 million, after toll revenues allowed its construction.

A rehabilitation project commenced in 2000 and was carried out by Steinman, Boynton, Gronquist and Birdsall, a successor of David B. Steinman's firm. Repairs took place nearly continuously for at least a decade, at a cost of $160 million. The bridge was renovated from late 2017 to late 2020. The $86 million project replaced the last remnants of the original upper and lower decks, reopened the pedestrian and cycling path, eliminated the lower-level toll booth, upgraded roadway lighting, and made seismic improvements.

Tolls
As of April 11, 2021, drivers pay $7.50 per car or $4.28 per motorcycle for tolls by mail/non-NYCSC E-Z Pass. E-ZPass users with transponders issued by the New York E-ZPass Customer Service Center pay $3.00 per car or $2.05 per motorcycle. Mid-Tier NYCSC E-Z Pass users pay $4.62 per car or $3.17 per motorcycle.

The original toll was 10 cents. In January 2010, the MTA announced that it planned to implement a pilot program on the Henry Hudson Bridge to phase out toll booths and use open road tolling. On January 20, 2011, this toll pilot project got underway. Drivers without E-ZPass are sent a bill in the mail. The new tolling system was implemented on November 10, 2012, and has since been implemented on all nine MTA crossings.

On November 20, 2016, the tollbooths were dismantled, as drivers were no longer able to pay cash at the bridge. Instead, cameras and E-ZPass readers are mounted on new overhead gantries manufactured by TransCore near where the booths were located.  A vehicle without E-ZPass has a picture taken of its license plate and a bill for the toll is mailed to its owner. For E-ZPass users, sensors detect their transponders wirelessly.

References
Notes

External links

NYC Roads entry

Bridges completed in 1936
Bridges in Manhattan
Bridges in the Bronx
Bridges over the Harlem River
Double-decker bridges
Inwood, Manhattan
Open-spandrel deck arch bridges in the United States
Pedestrian bridges in New York City
Plate girder bridges in the United States
Road bridges in New York City
Robert Moses projects
Spuyten Duyvil, Bronx
Steel bridges in the United States
Toll bridges in New York City
Triborough Bridge and Tunnel Authority
Bridge light displays